Hyden is a home rule-class city in and the county seat of Leslie County, Kentucky, United States. The population was 365 at the 2010 census. It is located at the junction of U.S. Route 421 and Kentucky Route 80, along the Middle Fork of the Kentucky River.

History
The area was first settled around 1800 by the Sizemores, a mixed-blood (Anglo and Native-American) family migrating from North Carolina, with a brief stay in Hawkins County, Tennessee, before making it to Kentucky. John "Rock House" Sizemore and his wife, Nancy (Bowling) Sizemore, lived in a rock house about a hundred yards up from the mouth of the creek which would later bear his name (Rockhouse Creek). John Rock House later sold the land to a Lewis man who then donated the land to the government, which became the town of Hyden. The town was established in 1878 and incorporated in 1882, and was named after John Hyden, a state senator of the time who helped form Leslie County. The mountainous terrain made the region difficult to access except by river, which was no longer the dominant form of transportation by the late 19th century, hindering growth.

Frontier Nursing University opened in Hyden in 1939.

In July 1978, Richard Nixon came to Hyden to make his first public speech since resigning from the presidency during the Watergate crisis. Hyden was picked because Congressman Tim Lee Carter invited him to attend the dedication of a recreation facility and Nixon wanted a town that had heavily supported his presidential runs. Leslie County Judge-Executive C. Allen Muncy claimed the Nixon invitation prompted the U.S. Department of Justice to obtain indictments of him and his associates on vote-fraud charges; while on appeal for his conviction, he won renomination in the Republican primary but lost the 1981 general election to independent Kermit Keen.

Geography
Hyden is located in north-central Leslie County at  (37.163456, -83.375065), in the valley of the Middle Fork of the Kentucky River. Most of the city is on the west side of the river, at the confluence of Rockhouse Creek from the west.

U.S. Route 421 and Kentucky Route 80 pass through Hyden as its Main Street, leading west  to Manchester. In the other direction, US 421 leads south up the Middle Fork valley and over Pine Mountain  to Harlan, while KY 80 leads northeast  to Combs, near Hazard. Kentucky Route 118 (Tim Couch Pass) is a three-lane highway leading northwest from Hyden  to the Hal Rogers Parkway at Thousandsticks. Kentucky Route 257 (Dryhill Road) is a local road that leads north from Hyden down the valley of the Middle Fork  to Confluence.

Climate
The climate in this area is characterized by hot, humid summers and generally mild to cool winters.  According to the Köppen Climate Classification system, Hyden has a humid subtropical climate, abbreviated "Cfa" on climate maps.

Demographics

As of the census of 2000, there were 204 people, 95 households, and 58 families residing in the city. The racial makeup of the city was 99.51% White and 0.49% Native American. Hispanic or Latino of any race were 0.98% of the population.

There were 95 households, out of which 18.9% had children under the age of 18 living with them, 41.1% were married couples living together, 15.8% had a female householder with no husband present, and 38.9% were non-families. 36.8% of all households were made up of individuals, and 21.1% had someone living alone who was 65 years of age or older. The average household size was 2.07 and the average family size was 2.69.

In the city, the population was spread out, with 15.7% under the age of 18, 10.3% from 18 to 24, 20.6% from 25 to 44, 27.9% from 45 to 64, and 25.5% who were 65 years of age or older. The median age was 48 years. For every 100 females, there were 74.4 males. For every 100 females age 18 and over, there were 68.6 males.

The median income for a household in the city was $26,429, and the median income for a family was $32,500. Males had a median income of $24,792 versus $31,250 for females. The per capita income for the city was $13,966. About 3.2% of families and 10.5% of the population were below the poverty line, including none of those under the age of eighteen and 24.4% of those 65 or over.

Education
Hyden has a lending library, the Leslie County Public Library.

Notable people
 Mary Carson Breckinridge, founder of the first nurse midwifery school in the United States and champion of rural public health 
 Tim Couch, NFL quarterback
 John Hensley, actor
 Ken Keen, lieutenant general, former Military Deputy Commander of United States Southern Command
 C. Wesley Morgan, businessman and Kentucky state legislator
 The Osborne Brothers, bluegrass musicians
 Betty Jean Robinson, gospel singer
 Willie Sandlin, World War I Medal of Honor recipient

References

External links

 City of Hyden official website

County seats in Kentucky
Cities in Leslie County, Kentucky
Populated places established in 1878
Cities in Kentucky